Gerard Fortune, commonly known by his first name Gerard, is a Haitian artist. His exact date of birth is uncertain, though Gerard has said he was alive during the Haitian dictatorship of Jean Claude Duvalier, which would put his age at about 50–60 years old. Gerard was born and raised in the city of Petionville, a suburb of the Haitian capital Port-au-Prince.

Style and early works 
As an adult, Gerard worked as a pastry chef before starting to paint in 1978. He continued making new pieces, always in naive style – a brightly colored, childlike, style of painting.

The subjects of Gerard’s paintings are vast, ranging from everyday matters, Biblical scenes, portraits of Haitian generals and politicians, animals and athletes. Gerard himself has said, “I’m obligated to paint vodou and Jesus and flowers and the sea. And villages and anything that comes to mind.” “God tells me what to paint, the feeling of each painting.” He says that God gives hope to him. “Inspiration comes from God at all hours.”

Exhibits 
His work has been exhibited internationally in places like Nottingham Contemporary. Two of the places that include Gerard’s work in their permanent collections are Ramapo College, New Jersey and the Waterloo Center for the Arts in Waterloo, Iowa.

List of works 
 Title: Famille Bebe Doc
 Medium: Oil on canvas
 Date: c. 1986
 Location: Waterloo Center for the Arts, Waterloo, IA
 Description: Depicts a large white building with an orange picket fence in front of it. There is also seven figures scattered throughout the scene, and hills and trees in the background.
 Title: Girls Waving Flags 
 Medium: Paint on canvas
 Date: c. 2005
 Location: Waterloo Center for the Arts, Waterloo, IA
 Description: Two girls, one in a red dress, the other in a blue dress, stand against a colorful background waving flags. 
 Title: Jonah And The Whale
 Medium: Paint on canvas
 Date: n.d. 
 Location: Waterloo Center for the Arts, Waterloo, IA
 Description: This painting depicts the prophet Jonah being swallowed by a massive, pink fish. The background is lime green and dotted with pink flowers. 
 Title: Jesus King 
 Medium: Oil on canvas
 Date: n.d.
 Location: Waterloo Center for the Arts, Waterloo, IA
 Description: Jesus is painted wearing a crown and dressed in an orange robe with a red sash. He is portrayed coming out a cluster of clouds while a group of ten people look up.

References

Additional sources 
Gerard Fortune, (Collection Monnin: Petionville, Haiti, 2014).
Philippe Bécoulet, Dialogue du Réel et de L’imaginaire,( Association Franco-Haitienne, Haiti,1990).

Haitian male painters